Jeff Woolnough is a Canadian film and television director. His career began in the early 1990s and has won numerous awards directing multiple episodes of a variety of television series. His most prolific work has been with The Expanse and Vikings, for which he directed ten episodes of each.

Directing credits

His long-form (non-episodic) television work has included the miniseries Keep Your Head Up, Kid: The Don Cherry Story (winner Best TV Movie/Miniseries) and Wrath of Grapes: The Don Cherry Story Part 2 and the made-for-TV films  Jack (a biopic of Jack Layton, winner Best TV Movie/Miniseries) and Céline (a biopic of Céline Dion). Woolnough also directed two direct-to-video sequels to the film Universal Soldier, entitled Universal Soldier II: Brothers in Arms''' and Universal Soldier III: Unfinished Business ''.

References

External links
 

Living people
Canadian television directors
Canadian film directors
Year of birth missing (living people)